Lydia was an Iron Age kingdom of western Asia Minor.

Lydia may also refer to:

Arts and media

Music
 Lydia (band), an indie rock band
 Lydia (singer) (born 1980), Spanish pop singer
 "Lydia" (Fur Patrol song), 2000
 "Lydia" (Highly Suspect song), 2015
 "Lydia", a song by Dean Friedman, 1978
 "Lydia", a song by F.I.R. from F.I.R., 2004
 "Lydia", a song by Jonathan Richman from Back in Your Life, 1979
 Lydia, a 1974 album by Cold Blood
 "Lydia", an 1871 composition by Gabriel Fauré

Other media
 Lydia (film), a 1941 film by Julien Duvivier
 Lydia (play), a 2008 play by Octavio Solis
 HMS Lydia, a fictional ship commanded by Horatio Hornblower in The Happy Return, a novel by C.S. Forester
 Lydia (The Walking Dead), a fictional character from The Walking Dead

People
Lydia (name), a feminine first name (includes a list of people named Lydia)

Places
 Lydia (satrapy), an administrative province (satrapy) of the Achaemenid Empire
 Lydia, Kansas
 Lydia, Louisiana
 Lydia, Minnesota
 Lydia, South Carolina
 Lydia, Virginia
 110 Lydia, an asteroid

Ships
 Lydia (whaling bark), a wrecked ship beneath King Street in San Francisco, California, US
 MV Moonta or Lydia, a passenger ship
 USS Lydia, a list of United States Navy ships
 USS Lydia (ID-3524), a cargo ship in commission from 1918 to 1919
 USS Lydia (SP-62), a patrol vessel in commission from 1917 to 1919

See also 
 "Lydia the Tattooed Lady", a 1939 song written by Harold Arlen and Yip Harburg
 Lidia (disambiguation)
 Lydian (disambiguation)